Buddleja cardenasii is a species endemic only to the region of Cochabamba in Bolivia at an altitude of around 3,000 m. The species was first described and named by Standley in 1935.

Description
Buddleja cardenasii is a dioecious shrub 3–4 m high, with branches which are subquadrangular and tomentose. The subcoriaceous leaves are elliptic, lanceolate or ovate, 10–12 cm long by 8 cm wide, with a glabrescent and rugose upper surface. The orange inflorescences are paniculate 7–25 cm long by 7–20 cm wide, comprising cymes each with 6–9 flowers; the corollas are 3–3.5 mm long.

The species is very similar to B. soratae; further research may well prove them conspecific.

Cultivation
The shrub is not known to be in cultivation.

References

cardenasii
Flora of Bolivia
Flora of South America